Sir Walter Lee or Walter Attelee (c. 1350–1395), of Albury, Hertfordshire, was an English politician.

Life
Lee was born in either 1348 or 1353. He was the son and heir of Sir John Lee of Albury, who died in 1370, and was the stewart of the household of Edward III of England. Lee's mother was named Joan. Lee's brother was probably Thomas Lee II, MP. By July 1373, he had married a woman named Margaret.

Career
Lee was knighted by July 1370. He was a Member of Parliament for Hertfordshire in January 1377, 1379, January 1380, November 1380, 1381, 1385, 1386, February 1388, September 1388, January 1390 and November 1390. He was MP for Essex in 1391, 1393, and 1394.

He was appointed sheriff of Essex for 1389, and was still sheriff when he declared himself the winning candidate in the January 1390 election.

References

1350 births
1395 deaths
English MPs January 1377
People from East Hertfordshire District
English knights
High Sheriffs of Essex
English MPs 1379
English MPs January 1380
English MPs November 1380
English MPs 1381
English MPs 1385
English MPs 1386
English MPs February 1388
English MPs September 1388
English MPs January 1390
English MPs November 1390
English MPs 1391
English MPs 1393
English MPs 1394
Members of the Parliament of England for Hertfordshire